Amphithalamus elspethae is a species of minute sea snail, a marine gastropod mollusc or micromollusk in the family Anabathridae.

The genus name Amphitalamus has been recognized as a wrong spelling of Amphithalamus.

Description

Distribution

References

 Vine, P. (1986). Red Sea Invertebrates. Immel Publishing, London. 224 pp

Anabathridae
Gastropods described in 1910